"Out of My Head" is a song by the American band Fastball from their second studio album All the Pain Money Can Buy. The song is a rock ballad with gospel influence, dominated by Hammond organ and piano. Bassist Tony Scalzo is the lead singer on the song, with guitarist Miles Zuniga coming in with harmony during the last chorus. The song was released to American rock radio in January 1999 and to contemporary hit radio two months later.

"Out of My Head" peaked at number 20 on the US Billboard Hot 100, number 11 on the Canadian RPM Top Singles chart, and number 19 on the Icelandic Singles Chart. A music video directed by Jim Gable features the band performing the song in sepia tone. In 2016, an adapted version of the chorus was used in the song "Bad Things" by Machine Gun Kelly and Camila Cabello.

Critical reception
Reviewing the song for Billboard, Chuck Taylor compared the track to material by the Partridge Family, citing its short length and "plucky, air-light" guitar riff. He wrote that the song was "ultra-simple and super-catchy", adding that although the song was too "lightweight" for rock radio, it "illustrates Fastball's consistent ability to combine obvious melodies with ear-plucking lyrics."

Chart performance
In the United States, on the week of July 3, 1999, "Out of My Head" debuted at number 64 on the Billboard Hot 100, reaching its peak of number 20 nine weeks afterward, on September 4. It spent a total of 20 weeks on the Hot 100 and ended 1999 as the country's 88th-best-performing song. It also appeared on three other Billboard charts, peaking at number 14 on the Adult Alternative Songs chart, number eight on the Mainstream Top 40, and number three on the Adult Top 40. On Canada's RPM Top Singles chart, after debuting at number 44 on June 21, 1999, it climbed to number 11 on September 6, ending the year as Canada's 59th-most-successful hit. On the RPM Adult Contemporary listing, the single peaked at number 33 the following issue.

The song did not make as big of an impact worldwide, charting only in Australia and Iceland. In the latter country, "Out of My Head" received airplay before its official American release, allowing it to make its first chart appearance at number 22 on March 5, 1999. Two weeks later, it peaked at number 19 on the Íslenski Listinn Topp 40. In Australia, the song made its debut on July 19, 1999, peaking at number 65.

Track listing
All songs were written by Tony Scalzo except "Altamont", written by Miles Zuniga.

Australian CD single
 "Out of My Head"
 "Altamont"
 "Human Torch"

Credits and personnel
Credits are adapted from the Australian CD single liner notes.

Studios
 Recorded at A&M Studios (Hollywood, California)
 Mixed at Image Recording Studios (Los Angeles, California)
 Mastered at Bernie Grundman Mastering (Hollywood, California)

Personnel

 Miles Zuniga – vocals, guitar
 Tony Scalzo – vocals, bass guitar
 Joey Shuffield – drums, percussion
 Bennett Salvay – piano, Hammond organ
 Joe Barresi – engineering
 Dave Reed – assistant engineering
 Chris Lord-Alge – mixing
 Brian Gardner – mastering

Charts

Weekly charts

Year-end charts

Release history

References

1990s ballads
1997 songs
1999 singles
Fastball (band) songs
Hollywood Records singles
Rock ballads